A causewayed enclosure is a type of large prehistoric earthwork common to the early Neolithic in Europe. It is an enclosure marked out by ditches and banks, with a number of causeways crossing the ditches. More than 100 examples are recorded in France and 70 in England, while further sites are known in Scandinavia, Belgium, Germany, Italy, Ireland and Slovakia.

The term "causewayed enclosure" is now preferred to the older term, causewayed camp, as it has been demonstrated that the sites did not necessarily serve as occupation sites.

Construction
Causewayed enclosures are often located on hilltop sites, encircled by one to four concentric ditches with an internal bank.  Enclosures located in lowland areas are generally larger than hilltop ones.  Crossing the ditches at intervals are causeways which give the monuments their names.  It appears that the ditches were excavated in sections, leaving the wide causeways intact in between.  They should not be confused with segmented, or causewayed ring ditches, which are smaller and are thought to relate only to funerary activity, or with hillforts, which appeared later and had a definite defensive function. With regard to defensive functionality, however, evidence of timber palisades has been found at some sites such as Hambledon Hill.

Function
Archaeological evidence implies that the enclosures were 
visited occasionally by Neolithic groups rather than being permanently occupied. The presence of human remains in the banks and ditches of the enclosures has been seen as an attempt by the builders to connect their ancestors with the land and thus begin to anchor themselves to specific areas. Longitudinal sections excavated along the ditches by archaeologists suggest that the builders repeatedly redug the ditches and each time deliberately deposited pottery and human and animal bones, apparently as a regular ritual. Environmental archaeology suggests that the European landscape was heavily forested when the enclosures were built; they were rare clearings in the woodland that were used for various social and economic activities.

In the 1970s the archaeologist Peter Drewett suggested seven possible functions for the sites:

 Settlement
 Defence
 Cattle compounds or kraals
 Trade centres
 Communal meeting places for feasting and other social activities
 Cult/ritual centres
 Burial sites

Other interpretations have seen the causeways as symbolic of multi-directional access to the site by scattered communities, the enclosures as funerary centres for excarnation or the construction of the site being a communal act of creation by a fragmented society.

Animal remains (especially cattle bone), domestic waste and pottery have been found at the sites, however there has been limited evidence of any structures.  In some locations, such as Windmill Hill, Avebury, evidence of human occupation predates the enclosure.  Generally, it appears that the ditches were permitted to silt up, even while the camps were in use, and then re-excavated episodically. It is unlikely that they had a strong defensive purpose. The earthworks may have been designed to keep out wild animals rather than people. The sequential addition of second, third and fourth circuits of banks and ditches may have come about through growing populations adding to the significance of their peoples' monument over time. In some cases, they appear to have evolved into more permanent settlements.

Most causewayed enclosures have been ploughed away in the intervening millennia and are recognized through aerial archaeology.  The first were constructed in the fifth millennium BC and by the early third millennium BC; notable regional variations occur in their construction.  French examples begin to demonstrate elaborate horn-shaped entrances which are interpreted as being designed to impress from afar rather than serve any practical purpose.

Aubrey Burl believes that building of causewayed enclosures declined by 3000 BC and they were superseded by more localised types of earthworks and other structures.  In Britain, such replacements include Stonehenge I, Flagstones, Duggleby Howe and Ring of Bookan, and the later henge monuments.

Examples
Examples of causewayed enclosures include:

England

 Barkhale Camp, West Sussex
 Combe Hill, East Sussex
 Crickley Hill, Gloucestershire
 Hambledon Hill, Dorset
 Hembury, Devon
 Knap Hill, Wiltshire
 Maiden Bower, Bedfordshire
 Rams Hill (on the Berkshire Downs)
 Robin Hood's Ball near Stonehenge
 The Trundle, West Sussex
 Whitehawk Camp, East Sussex
 Windmill Hill, Avebury, Wiltshire
 Some tor enclosures, such as that at Carn Brea, are believed to have served a similar purpose in south western Britain.

France
 Champ Durand
 Chez Reine near Semussac
 Diconche
 La Coterelle
 La Mastine

Ireland
 Donegore, County Antrim
 Magheraboy Causewayed Enclosure, County Sligo

Portugal
 Castro of Zambujal in its second construction phase.

Spain
 Monte da Lagoa in Narón, Galicia.

Germany 
 Albersdorf-Dieksknöll
Büdelsdorf

References

Further reading
 A. Oswald, M. Barber and C. Dyer, The Creation of Monuments: Neolithic Causewayed Enclosures of the British Isles (1999)

 
Stone Age Europe
Types of monuments and memorials